Noemi Féliz García (born September 27, 1988 in Ponferrada, León) is a Spanish swimmer, who specialized in freestyle events. Feliz represented Spain at the 2008 Summer Olympics in Beijing, where she competed for the women's 4 × 200 m freestyle relay, along with her fellow swimmers María Fuster, Melania Costa, and Arantxa Ramos. She swam on the third leg, with an individual-split time of 1:59.77, finishing seventh in the first heat and fourteenth overall to her team, for a total time of 8:00.90.

References

External links
 
 
 

Living people
Olympic swimmers of Spain
Swimmers at the 2008 Summer Olympics
Spanish female freestyle swimmers
People from Ponferrada
Sportspeople from the Province of León
1988 births
Mediterranean Games silver medalists for Spain
Mediterranean Games medalists in swimming
Swimmers at the 2005 Mediterranean Games
21st-century Spanish women